Collinsville High School is a  public high school located in Collinsville, Texas (USA). It is part of the Collinsville Independent School District located in west central Grayson County and classified as a 2A school by the UIL.  In 2015, the school was rated "Met Standard" by the Texas Education Agency.

Athletics
The Collinsville Pirates compete in these sports - 

Volleyball, Football, Basketball, Powerlifting, Tennis, Track, Softball & Baseball

State Titles
Baseball - 
1999(1A)
Girls Basketball - 
1956(B)
Volleyball - 
2007(1A)

State Finalists
Baseball - 
1998(1A)
Girls Basketball - 
1958(B)
Softball - 
2006(1A)

References

External links
 

Schools in Grayson County, Texas
Public high schools in Texas
Public middle schools in Texas